Otho Scott Lee (December 6, 1840 – August 28, 1918) was an American politician and lawyer from Maryland. He served as a member of the Maryland House of Delegates, representing Harford County in 1874.

Early life
Otho Scott Lee was born on December 6, 1840, to Hannah (née Bryarly) and Richard D. Lee. His father died when Lee was one year old. He was educated at Bel Air Academy. He then became a law student until the Civil War interrupted his studies. After the war, he studied law under Henry W. Archer.

Career
Lee was appointed a sergeant in the Confederate States Army during the Civil War. He served under Major Johnson in J.E.B. Stuart's horse artillery.

Lee served as a colonel on the staff of Maryland governor John Lee Carroll.

Lee was a Democrat. He served as a member of the Maryland House of Delegates, representing Harford County in 1874. He served as counsel to the Harford County school commissioners from 1881 to 1916.

Lee served as the first president of the Bel Air Water and Light Company, The Permanent Building Association and the Farmers and Merchants Bank.

Personal life
Lee married Sarah B. Griffith in 1867. They had ten children, Mrs. John Scott Parker, Hannah B., Helen M., Elizabeth D., Cassandra, Margaret B., John L. G., Otho S., Robert B. and Henry A. W. His wife died in 1898. Lee married Helen A. Bradshaw in 1904. They had two children, Margaret and Robert. His son John L. G. Lee was a member of the Maryland House of Delegates.

Lee died on August 28, 1918, at his home on Main Street in Bel Air. He was buried at Rock Spring Cemetery.

References

1840 births
1918 deaths
People from Harford County, Maryland
People of Maryland in the American Civil War
Confederate States Army officers
Democratic Party members of the Maryland House of Delegates
Maryland lawyers